The Minaean language (also Minaic, Madhabaic or Madhābic) was an Old South Arabian or Ṣayhadic language spoken in Yemen in the times of the Old South Arabian civilisation. The main area of its use may be located in the al-Jawf region of North-East Yemen, primarily in the Wādī Madhāb. Most of texts in this language were composed by the Minaeans, but the other civil-temple communities of the Wādī Madhāb (Nashshan, Kaminahu, Ḥaram, and Inabba') also used it as a literary medium.

History

The earliest Minaean inscriptions are contemporary with the earliest Sabaean ones, i.e. the 8th century BCE, though they are less numerous, and come from the cities along Wadi Madhaab, to the north-east of Ma'rib.  Minaean trading posts, and Minaean inscriptions are also found outside South Arabia, as in the ancient oasis of Dēdan (the present day Al-'Ula in Saudi Arabia), and even on the Greek island of Delos and in Egypt. Minaean seems to disappear as a written language about the end of the 2nd century BCE.

Phonology

The phonology of the ancient Minaean language seems to be essentially similar to that of the other Old South Arabian languages.

Grammatical features peculiar to Minaean

Due to the limited amount of texts that have survived, many forms are not attested, though hopefully the discovery of new texts will provide us with more source material. In Minaean, external plurals seem to be especially common; an -h is often used at the end of words in the construct state, even in the singular.

Minaean nominal endings

(Compare the table given under Sabaean language.)

Relative pronouns

Particles

Whereas Sabaean uses the preposition l- to mean "to(wards)", or to express the dative case, Minaean often has k- (compare Ḥaḑramitic h-). The particle k- has a prefixed s2 in Minaean, as in bn s2-kḏ "from (the possibility) that ...". Minaean, like the other non-Sabaean languages also has a temporal conjunction mty ("when").

The Minaean negative particle, which has been so far badly attested, is lhm.

Verbs

Minaean is distinguished from the other Old South Arabian languages by having an extra form for verb stems with a reduplicated second radical, spelled fˁˁl (as in ˁlly, "raise").

Conjugation of the perfect tense

Minaean, like the other South Arabian languages, forms the perfect tense by adding suffixes. Unlike the other dialects, however, it does not write the dual and plural endings, they are therefore the same as the singular; for example: s3l''' ("he/they dedicated").

References

Bibliography
Leonid Kogan and Andrey Korotayev: Sayhadic Languages (Epigraphic South Arabian). Semitic Languages''. London: Routledge, 1997, p. 157-183.
Andrey Korotayev. Ancient Yemen. Oxford: Oxford University Press, 1995.

External links
Corpus of Minaic Inscriptions from the Digital Archive for the Study of pre-Islamic Arabian Inscriptions (DASI)

Old South Arabian languages
Ancient history of Yemen
Languages of Yemen
Languages attested from the 13th century BC
Languages extinct in the 1st century